Alan Crompton (born 6 March 1958) is an English former footballer who played as a midfielder for Sunderland, Blackburn Rovers, Wigan Athletic and Runcorn.

He was the first ever player to come onto the field as a substitute for Wigan Athletic as a Football League team.

References

External links

1958 births
Living people
Footballers from Bolton
Association football midfielders
English footballers
Sunderland A.F.C. players
Blackburn Rovers F.C. players
Wigan Athletic F.C. players
Runcorn F.C. Halton players
English Football League players